The Toyota NZ engine family is a straight-4 piston engine series. The 1NZ series uses aluminum engine blocks and DOHC cylinder heads. It also uses sequential fuel injection, and has 4 valves per cylinder with VVT-i.

The engines are produced by Toyota's Kamigo Plant in Toyota, Aichi, Japan (1NZ for Prius, NZ for Vitz and ist, and for Sienta); by Siam Toyota Manufacturing in Chonburi, Thailand (NZ for NBC cars such as the 1NZ-FE for the Yaris and Vios); and by Indus Motor Company in Karachi, Pakistan (2NZ for Corolla).

1NZ-FXE

The 1NZ-FXE is a hybrid  version. It features forged steel connecting rods and an aluminum intake manifold. The engine has a high physical compression ratio of 13.0:1, but the closing of the inlet valve is delayed, for an effective compression ratio of 9.5:1. The net result is that the engine has a greater effective expansion than compression—making it a simulated Atkinson cycle, rather than a conventional Otto cycle.

The reduction in cylinder charge means reduced torque and power output, but efficiency is increased. This combination makes the 1NZ-FXE suitable for use with the Hybrid Synergy Drive, where peak torque and power demands can be met by the electric motor and battery.
Peak thermal efficiency is about 37%. 
Production was discontinued in 2009, with the arrival of the 3rd generation Prius, which replaced the 1NZ-FXE with the 2ZR-FXE.

In 2012, upon the arrival of the Prius c (North America), the Aqua (Japan), and the Yaris Hybrid (Europe), an improved version was introduced.

The 1NZ-FXE Hybrid Synergy Drive in the Toyota Prius has won several International Engine of the Year awards:

Best Eco-friendly 2000
Best Eco-friendly 2001
Best Fuel Economy 2005
Best 1.4-litre to 1.8-litre 2005
Best Fuel Economy 2006
Best 1.4-litre to 1.8-litre 2006

Applications:
Toyota Corolla (Axio/Fielder)
Toyota Prius (XW10 & XW20)
Toyota Prius c/Toyota Aqua
Toyota Probox
Toyota Sienta (XP170)
Toyota Yaris

1NZ-FXP

The 1NZ-FXP is a hybrid  version. It features forged steel connecting rods and an aluminum intake manifold. The engine has a high physical compression ratio of 13.0:1, but the closing of the inlet valve is delayed, for an effective compression ratio of 9.5:1. The net result is that the engine has a greater effective expansion than compression—making it a simulated Atkinson cycle, rather than a conventional Otto cycle.

The reduction in cylinder charge means reduced torque and power output, but efficiency is increased. This combination makes the 1NZ-FXP suitable for use with the Hybrid Synergy Drive, where peak torque and power demands can be met by the electric motor, battery and LPG-hybrid system.
Peak thermal efficiency is about 37%.

Applications:
Toyota JPN Taxi (NTP10)

1NZ-FE

The 1NZ-FE is a  conventional Otto-cycle variant of the 1NZ-FXE with VVT-i on the intake camshaft. The engine block is found in many Toyota models assembled in Japan and Asian countries. It retains the same bore and stroke, but the compression ratio is lowered to 10.5:1. The redline is 6400 rpm.

Applications:
Toyota Vios/Belta
Toyota Yaris/Echo
Scion xA/Toyota ist
Scion xB (XP30) (1st generation)/Toyota bB (XP30) (1st generation)
Toyota Raum
Toyota Porte
Toyota Platz
Toyota Auris
Toyota Fun Cargo/Toyota Yaris Verso
Toyota Premio
Toyota Allion
Toyota Corolla (Axio/Fielder, RunX, Allex, Spacio)
Toyota Sienta
WiLL VS
Toyota Probox
Toyota Ractis
Geely CK (Produced under license)
Geely MK (Produced under license)
Great Wall Voleex C10
Great Wall Voleex C30

1NZ-FE Turbo
The engine block is found in many Toyota models assembled in Asian countries. It retains the same bore and stroke. The redline is 6400 rpm.

Applications:
Toyota Vios Turbo (Thailand)
Toyota Vitz RS Turbo/TRD Turbo M/GRMN Turbo (Japan)
Toyota Yaris T-Sport Turbo (limited edition of 400 units) (Europe)
Toyota Corolla Axio GT (Japan)

2NZ-FE

The 2NZ-FE is a  version. In 2000, it won the International Engine of the Year award in the 1-litre to 1.4-litre category.

Applications:
Toyota Yaris/Echo/Vitz
Toyota Fun Cargo/Toyota Yaris Verso
Toyota Vios/Belta
Toyota Platz
Toyota Porte
Toyota Corolla (E140), Pakistan only
Toyota Corolla (E170), Pakistan only
Toyota bB
Toyota Ist
Toyota Corolla (E120), Japan and Middle East only
Nanjing Yuejin Soyat (based on the SEAT Ibiza Mark I)
Toyota Probox

See also
List of Toyota engines

References

External links

Japanese Toyota Aqua specifications
2NZ-FE 1.3L Engine Specs

Nz
Straight-four engines
Gasoline engines by model